Robert Bittenbender is an American mixed media artist living and working in Brooklyn, New York. In 2019, Bittenbender was selected to participate in the Whitney Biennial 2019.

Artistic practice
Bittenbender's work often consists of complex assemblages, using a spectrum of materials from found materials, printed materials, zip-ties, photographs, paint, purchased materials, and/or others. Their works have been described as "complex nests."

Solo exhibitions
Metropolitan - HIGH ART - Paris, France (2015-2016)
The Aviary - LOMEX - New York (2017)
Cosmo Freak - LOMEX - New York (2018)
Space Vixen - LOMEX - New York (2019)

Group exhibitions
These Are Not My Horses - James Fuentes (2015)
A Wasteland - LOMEX, New York City (2015-2016)
Looking Back / The 11th White Columns Annual - White Columns (2017)
Ormai - Balice Hertling, Paris (2018)
Foundation for Contemporary Arts 2018 Benefit Exhibition (2018)
Whitney Biennial (2019) - curated by Rujeko Hockley and Jane Panetta

Awards 
 NYSCA/NYFA Artist Fellowship Program grant (2017)

References

External links
 Robert Bittenbender - ContemporaryArtDaily.com

Year of birth missing (living people)
Living people
21st-century American artists
American contemporary artists